Droyßiger-Zeitzer Forst is a Verbandsgemeinde ("collective municipality") in the Burgenlandkreis district, in Saxony-Anhalt, Germany. Before 1 January 2010, it was a Verwaltungsgemeinschaft. It is situated west of Zeitz. The seat of the Verbandsgemeinde is in Droyßig.

The Verbandsgemeinde Droyßiger-Zeitzer Forst consists of the following municipalities:

 Droyßig1
 Gutenborn 
 Kretzschau 
 Schnaudertal 
 Wetterzeube

References

Verbandsgemeinden in Saxony-Anhalt